Trestonia capreola is a species of beetle in the family Cerambycidae. It was described by Ernst Friedrich Germar in 1824. It is known from Brazil, Argentina and Paraguay.

References

capreola
Beetles described in 1824